Paul Sterling (born 2 August 1964) is an English former professional rugby league footballer who played in the 1990s and 2000s.

Background
Sterling was born in Wolverhampton, Staffordshire, England.

Career
Sterling started his rugby league career in 1993, joining Hull F.C. from rugby union club Bradford & Bingley. After spending the 1996 season on loan at Hunslet Hawks, he joined Leeds Rhinos. Sterling was the top try scorer for Leeds Rhinos during 1997's Super League II.

Sterling won a cap for England while at Leeds in 1999 against France, and won caps for Wales in the 2000 Rugby League World Cup against Cook Islands, Lebanon, New Zealand, and Papua New Guinea, at 36 years of age, he was the oldest player in the tournament.

In September 2000, Sterling took Leeds to an employment tribunal, claiming that he had been discriminated against by head coach Dean Lance earlier in the year. In December 2000, Leeds were ordered to pay Sterling £16,000 as compensation and to offer him a new one-year contract. Leeds intended to appeal against this ruling, but in April 2001, Sterling announced his retirement, stating that he had lost the desire to play the sport due to the incident.

References

External links
The Teams: Wales
(archived by web.archive.org) Profile at leedsrugby
(archived by web.archive.org) England battle to French wins

1964 births
Black British sportsmen
Bradford RFC players
England Knights national rugby league team players
England national rugby league team players
English rugby league players
Hull F.C. players
Hunslet R.L.F.C. players
Leeds Rhinos players
Living people
Rugby league players from Wolverhampton
Rugby league wingers
Wales national rugby league team players